Caran d'Ache was the pseudonym of the 19th century French satirist and political cartoonist Emmanuel Poiré (6 November 1858 – 25 February 1909). The pseudonym comes from  meaning "pencil" in Turkic languages.  While his first work glorified the Napoleonic era, he went on to create "stories without words" and as a contributor to newspapers such as the Le Figaro, he is sometimes hailed as one of the precursors of comic strips. The Swiss art products company Caran d'Ache is named after him.

Biography 

Born in Moscow, 6 November 1858, he was the grandson of an Officer-Grenadier in Napoleon's Grande Armée who, wounded during the Battle of Borodino, had stayed behind in Russia. After his grandfather's death he was adopted by a Polish family whose daughter he later married.

In 1877 Caran d'Ache emigrated to France where he took French citizenship and joined the Army for five years where he was assigned to design uniforms for the ministry of war and where he also contributed to their journal, La Vie militaire, with satirical illustrations, among them some caricatures of the German army.

In 1898 he co-founded the satirical, anti-Dreyfusard weekly magazine Psst... ! along with fellow artist and designer Jean-Louis Forain. The magazine lasted 85 issues and was made up entirely of editorial cartoons by Caran d'Ache and Forain, caricaturing society and its scandals from an antisemitic, pro-Army viewpoint.

He died in Paris on 25 February 1909 at the age of 50.

Works 

Much of his work was contributed to La Vie Parisienne, Le Figaro illustré, La Caricature, and Le Chat Noir. He also issued various albums of sketches and posters, some listed below. and illustrated a good many books, notably Benardaky's Prince Kozakokoff.
1880: His first drawings of military caricatures were published in La Chronique Parisienne.
1892: Caran d'Ache published Carnet de Chèques ("Checkbook") on the Panama Canal Affair.
1895: He started publishing editorial cartoons (every Monday) in the daily Le Figaro, and soon thereafter for the popular weekly Le Rire.
 A poster for an «Exposition Russe» in Paris was published in Les Maîtres de l'Affiche.
1898: Caran d'Ache published the cartoon  ("A Family Dinner"), highlighting the intense disagreements in French society regarding the Dreyfus Affair. It appeared a month after Émile Zola's famous J'Accuse, which inflamed and hardened opinion on both sides.

Sources

External links 

Caran d'Ache biography on Lambiek Comiclopedia

1858 births
1909 deaths
Writers from Paris
French poster artists
French draughtsmen
French caricaturists
Russian people of French descent
Russian emigrants to France
Members of the Ligue de la patrie française